Wang Jun (Chinese: 王君; born 12 April 1990) is a Chinese footballer who plays as a midfielder for Yanbian Longding in the China League Two division.

Club career
Wang Jun started his football career with third tier football club Beijing Baxy&Shengshi and saw them take over second tier club Beijing Hongdeng before the start of the 2010 league season. He would go on to establish himself as vital young player within the team before joining promotion chasing club Dalian Aerbin who went on to win the 2011 China League One division and promotion to the top tier.  

On 26 February 2014, Wang transferred to China League One side Qingdao Jonoon. He would revive his career and established himself as a vital member of their team. After two seasons with the club his contract would be up for renewal, however he would be unable to negotiate any new terms and the club refused to register him for the 2016 league season. After a season being dropped and seeing out the remainder of his contract, Wang joined third tier club Hunan Billows on 13 March 2017.

On 26 February 2019, Wang transferred to another League Two side in Yinchuan Helanshan. He would personally have his most productive season in his career by scoring ten goals throughout the league campaign, however Yinchuan failed to hand in their salary and bonus confirmation form to the Chinese Football Association and were disqualified for the following 2020 China League Two campaign.

On 8 August 2020, he signed with Wuhan Three Towns. In his first season with the club he would go on to aid them in winning the division title and promotion into the second tier. He would leave to join fourth tier club Lingshui Dingli Jingcheng before joining third tier club Yanbian Longding.

Career statistics
.

Honours
Dalian Aerbin
 China League One: 2011.

Wuhan Three Towns
China League Two: 2020.

References

External links
 

1990 births
Living people
Chinese footballers
Footballers from Dalian
Beijing Sport University F.C. players
Dalian Professional F.C. players
Qingdao Hainiu F.C. (1990) players
Hunan Billows players
Chinese Super League players
China League One players
Association football midfielders